Vaikarai Pookkal is a 1996 Indian Tamil-language romantic drama film directed by E. Mu. Vetrivalan. The film stars Raja, Rajashree, Ponvannan and newcomer Annam, with Shanmugasundaram, Samikannu, A. K. Veerasamy, Karan and Tharini playing supporting roles. It was released on 30 December 1996.

Plot
Many years ago, in the village Rasarasanpatti, Nallathambi (Ponvannan) who was from a poor family fell in love with Maari (Tharini) who was a from a wealthy family. Her brother Vellaisamy Gounder (Shanmugasundaram), the village chief, was against their love and humiliated him for being poor. Thereafter, Nallathambi married a lower-caste woman and Vellaisamy Gounder who strictly followed the caste system forced them to live outside their village. His wife (Varalakshmi) then died during childbirth.

Back to the present, Nallathambi's son Soori (Ponvannan) is a vagabond smuggling sandalwood in Kolli Malai. Deivanai (Rajashree) and Dhamayanthi (Annam) are sisters and they are the relatives of Vellaisamy Gounder. Deivanai and the village doctor Raja (Raja) fall in love with each other while Soori is still in love with his childhood sweetheart Dhamayanthi. In the meantime, Vellaisamy Gounder's son Shankar (Karan) who studied in the city returns to his native village and rapes a mentally ill village woman.

Raja and Deivanai eventually disclose their love affair to Vellaisamy Gounder and when he asks about Raja's caste, Raja refuses to tell him, therefore, Vellaisamy Gounder refuses to marry them. Deivanai then marries(Rajkanth) who has been fraudulently married to many women and the groom is arrested just after the marriage. Shankar was behind this scam and he now wants to marry her sister Dhamayanthi. Thereafter, Vellaisamy Gounder disowns his son Shankar for raping the mentally ill woman and decides to take care of the victim, and Vellaisamy Gounder finally understands that being a caste-oriented was stupid. The film ends with Raja and Deivanai falling in love again and Dhamayanthi accepting Soori's true love.

Cast

Raja as Raja
Rajashree as Deivanai
Ponvannan as Soori and Nallathambi
Annam as Dhamayanthi
Shanmugasundaram as Vellaisamy Gounder
Samikannu as Villager
A. K. Veerasamy as Soori's adoptive father
Karan as Shankar
Tharini as Mari
S. Saleth Sowri
Murali Krishna
Yuvan Swang as Shankar's friend
Aarthi as Raasi
Regina as Nila
Rajkanth as Groom
Pasi Sathya as Soori's adoptive mother
Varalakshmi as Vellaisamy Gounder's wife

Soundtrack

The film score and the soundtrack were composed by Devendran. The soundtrack, released in 1996, features 6 tracks.

References

1996 films
1990s Tamil-language films
Indian romantic drama films
1996 directorial debut films
1996 romantic drama films
Films scored by Devendran